Melissanthi Mahut (born September 20, 1988) is a Canadian and Greek actress. She is known for her role as Kassandra in Assassin's Creed Odyssey, and for playing Mita Xenakis in the Netflix film Eurovision Song Contest: The Story of Fire Saga.

Early life and education 
Mahut was born in Toronto, Canada and raised in Greece. Her father is a Quebecois, while her mother is Greek. She attended the National Theatre of Greece Drama School and later went on to study at the Royal Academy of Dramatic Art (RADA).  She graduated at RADA with a BA degree in Acting in 2012.

Career 
Mahut’s career started in Greece where she starred in theatre productions as well as in short and feature films such as Mythopathy (Νοτιάς), The Taste of Love (Η Γεύση της Αγάπης).

In 2017 she landed the role of Kassandra in the video game Assassin's Creed Odyssey for which she received widespread critical acclaim as well as global recognition for her performance including a nomination for the BAFTA Game Awards and The Game Awards.

In 2020 she appeared as the Greek Eurovision contestant Mita Xenakis in the Netflix film Eurovision Song Contest: The Story of Fire Saga alongside Will Ferrell, Rachel McAdams and Dan Stevens. The film was scheduled for a May 2020 release, but due to COVID-19 was postponed to June 26.  In 2020 Mahut voiced the character of Athena in the video game Immortals Fenyx Rising. She had a recurring role in two parts of the Greek anthology series The Other Me (Έτερος Εγώ) based on the 2016 Greek crime thriller of the same name. In 2022 she starred in a standalone episode of the Greek TV series Kart Postal.

In 2022, Mahut played Calliope in the eleventh episode of the Netflix production of Neil Gaiman's The Sandman.

Filmography

Stage

Accolades

References

External links 

 

Canadian film actresses
Greek film actresses
Living people
Canadian television actresses
Canadian stage actresses
Canadian video game actresses
Greek television actresses
Greek stage actresses
Canadian people of Greek descent
1988 births